Ko Yu-chin (born 1939) is a Taiwanese politician.

Ko studied law at Soochow University before attending the Institute of Revolutionary Practice. She worked for Chunghwa Post and served as secretary-general of the Republic of China Postal Workers' Union before moving to the Chinese Federation of Labor, as its executive director. Ko was appointed to the Legislative Yuan as a representative of laborers affiliated with the Kuomintang. After functional constituencies were phased out, Ko was reelected to the Legislative Yuan in 1992 and 1995 via the Kuomintang party list. She subsequently served as general secretary of the Chinese Association for Relief and Ensuing Services, and later became its honorary chairman.

References

1939 births
Living people
20th-century Taiwanese women politicians
Kuomintang Members of the Legislative Yuan in Taiwan
Members of the 1st Legislative Yuan in Taiwan
Members of the 2nd Legislative Yuan
Members of the 3rd Legislative Yuan
Postal officials
Women trade union leaders
Taiwanese trade unionists
Soochow University (Taiwan) alumni
Party List Members of the Legislative Yuan
Women trade unionists